The White Uno Gang was a criminal organization operating in Italy, mainly in Emilia-Romagna. The name of the gang refers to the Fiat Uno car, a common city car which was frequently used by this gang, being particularly easy to steal and difficult to identify given its widespread usage in Italy at the time. Most of the gang members were police officers with links to right wing extremism. Between 1987 and 1994, the gang pulled off 103 heists, mostly armed robberies, causing 24 deaths and 102 injuries.

The members

Roberto Savi
Born in Forlì on 19 May 1954; together with his brother Alberto, Roberto Savi was a member of the Polizia di Stato at the Questura of Bologna and covered the radio operator service in the operations center. As a young man he was an activist in the far-right wing Fronte della Gioventù. In the trials, Savi's blunt coldness shocked the audience as he described the most atrocious crimes he committed; when answering questions in the courtroom, he wouldn't say "yes" or "no", but instead "affirmative" or "negative".

Fabio Savi

Born in Forlì on 22 April 1960; brother of Roberto, co-founder of the gang. He, like his brothers, also applied to join the police, but an eyesight issue affected his career. Since he was 14 Fabio had had many different jobs, and he reportedly had a bad temper, being arrogant and aggressive. Together with Roberto, he is the only member of the gang present in every one of their criminal acts. Fabio was arrested a few days after his brother, 27 kilometers from the border with Austria, while trying to leave the country. He worked as a coachbuilder and truck driver, cohabiting in Torriana with a Romanian girl, Eva Mikula, whose testimony will prove decisive in the resolution of the case. After being sentenced to life, he was transferred to the Sollicciano prison in Florence, and later to that of Fossombrone.

Alberto Savi 
Born in Cesena on 19 February 1965, younger brother of Roberto and Fabio. Along with his brothers, he formed the main structure of the gang. Like Roberto, Alberto was a police officer, and at the time of his arrest he was serving with the Rimini police force. He was reportedly weak-willed, and was easily influenced by the more domineering personalities of his older brothers. He was sentenced to life on 26 November 1994. On 23 October 2010, he asked to be released after 16 years in prison. After 23 years in prison he received a permit to leave the prison for 12 hours in February 2017 to see his mother who was gravely ill. Since 2019 he has been granted similar permits for the Christmas holiday.

Pietro Gugliotta 
Born in Catania in 1960, Pietro did not take part in the group's murderous actions. However, he was sentenced to 18 years imprisonment. Also a policeman, he worked as a radio operator at the police headquarters in Bologna together with his friend Roberto Savi. He was released in 2008.

Marino Occhipinti 
Born in Santa Sofia, 25 February 1965; a minor member of the gang, he took part in an assault in Casalecchio di Reno on 19 February 1988 during which a security guard died. He was therefore sentenced to life imprisonment. Since 2002 he has been working in a cooperative.

Luca Vallicelli 
Luca Vallicelli was a policeman as well at the time of his arrest, which took place on 29 November 1994. He was an agent at the Traffic Police section of Cesena. A minor member of the gang, he only participated in the first robberies, which ended without any deaths. He pled guilty and was sentenced to three years and eight months. He is currently a free man, and was dismissed by the police.

Chronology of the main criminal actions 
In business from 1987 to the autumn of 1994, the gang committed 103 criminal acts, causing the death of 24 people and injuring another 102.

1987 

The gang began its crimes in 1987, devoting itself at night to the robberies of the motorway toll booths along the Autostrada A14.
On 19 June 1987 the gang first struck with a robbery at the toll booth of Pesaro, committed using a Fiat Regata owned by Alberto Savi to which they had affixed a false plate; the loot amounted to about 1,300,000 lire.

Immediately after the first shot, the gang scored 12 robberies at toll booths in about 2 months.

In October 1987 they organized an extortion attempt against a Rimini resident, Savino Grossi.
The Savi sent a letter to Grossi indicating the procedure for payment. The dealer pretended to give in to blackmail but had already warned the police station in Rimini. On 3 October Savino Grossi went on the highway with his car, hiding a police officer in his luggage rack, while other cars from the Rimini police station followed him a short distance away.

This operation was attended by the inspector Baglioni, whose own investigations in 1994 would lead to the members of the gang.
Grossi was contacted by the extortionists and stopped near a flyover just before the toll booth near Cesena.
With the intervention of the Police, a firefight broke out in which the inspector Antonio Mosca, who died on 29 July 1989 after a long period of suffering, was seriously injured.

1988 
On 30 January, Giampiero Picello, a security guard in Rimini, was killed during a robbery in a supermarket.

On 20 February, Carlo Beccari, a supermarket security guard in Casalecchio di Reno was killed. Francesco Cataldi, a colleague of Beccari, is wounded.

On 20 April, two carabinieri, Cataldo Stasi and Umberto Erriu, were killed while they were in a car park in Castel Maggiore, near Bologna, after they had stopped the car of the Savis.
During the investigation of this double murder, intentional misdirection of the line of investigation and manipulation of the collected evindence by a carabiniere, not directly involved in the actual criminal act and homicide was uncovered, former Carabinieri brigadier (equiv. to Police sergeant), Domenico Macauda was convicted to eight years in prison for his deception and corrupting the investigation initially thought to have been motivated by wanting to claim a bounty issued for successful capture of the gang members but a later investigation found that he may have actually been first to the scene before it was officially discovered and actually intentionally aided and abetted the gang in the assassination of their fellow officers and both planted false evidence and removed parts that could have potentially directly implicated the Savis being responsible. Only later intentionally misdirecting the case investigators to concentrate their efforts into a false direction, for which he received the 8 year prison sentence.

1989 
In 1989, during a robbery in a supermarket in the Corticella frazione of Bologna, Adolfino Alessandri, 52-year-old pensioner eyewitness was riddled with shots.

1990 
In 1990, 6 people were killed.

On 15 January, Giancarlo Armorati was seriously hit in Via Mazzini in Bologna, during a robbery at a post office that wounded many others. He will die a year later from his injuries.

On 6 October, Primo Zecchi, who noted the number of the criminals' license plate, was killed.

On 23 December, the gang opens fire on the caravans of the gypsy camp of Bologna in via
Gobetti, killing two victims (Rodolfo Bellinati and Patrizia Della Santina) and injuring others.

On 27 December, two people were killed in two different episodes of violence.
Luigi Pasqui, a 50-year-old merchant, was killed in a robbery at a Castel Maggiore petrol station while he was trying to push the alarm.
A few minutes later the gang killed Paride Pedini, who had approached the white Uno he found abandoned with open doors.

1991 and the Pilastro massacre 

On 4 January at around 10 pm, in the Pilastro district of Bologna, a patrol of carabinieri was fired upon by the criminal group. The gang was in that place by chance, on their way to San Lazzaro di Savena, looking for a car to steal. In via Casini the gang's car was overtaken by the patrol and the maneuver was interpreted by the criminals as an attempt to register the plate number and it was decided to liquidate the carabinieri.

After having flanked them, Roberto Savi fired some bullets at the soldiers, on the driver Otello Stefanini's side. Despite the serious injuries suffered, the carabinieri tried to escape, but crashed into rubbish bins. In a short time the car of the carabinieri was hit by a shower of bullets.
The other two carabinieri, Andrea Moneta and Mauro Mitilini, managed to get out of the car and to respond to the fire, injuring Roberto Savi. The power of the weapons used by the gang, however, left no hope and both the carabinieri remained on the asphalt. The three ended up with a shot to the back of the head.

The criminal group also took the patrol service paper and fled the site of the conflict.
The white Uno involved in the massacre was abandoned in San Lazzaro di Savena in the parking lot of via Gramsci and burned; one of the seats was dirty with the blood of Roberto Savi, who was slightly injured in the abdomen during the firefight. The massacre was immediately claimed by the terrorist group Falange Armata.
However, this claim was considered unreliable, since it came after the press release to the mass media.
The massacre remained unpunished for about four years. The investigators followed incorrect leads, which led them to indict subjects unrelated to each other. On 20 June 1992, on the basis of false testimony, the two Santagata brothers and the camorra affiliate Marco Medda were arrested, all of whom were prejudiced and residing in the Pilastro quarter. On 25 January 1995 they were declared not guilty of the crime by the tribunal of Bologna.

Later on, the killers will confess the crime during the trial.

On 20 April, Claudio Bonfiglioli was killed in Borgo Panigale during a robbery in his petrol station.

On 2 May, in a gun store in Bologna, Licia Ansaloni, owner of the shop, and Pietro Capolungo, retired carabiniere, are killed. During this robbery, a woman sees Roberto Savi outside of the shop, and after the robbery provides an identikit to the investigators. When it is shown to Ansaloni's husband, he declares that he might look a lot like Roberto Savi, his usual client, a policeman from Bologna. But nobody among the investigators actually connects Savi to the blood evidence.

On 19 June Graziano Mirri, father of a policeman, loses his life in Cesena, killed in front of his wife during a robbery in his petrol station in Viale Marconi.

On 18 August, Ndiaj Malik and Babou Chejkh, two Senegalese labourers, were killed in an ambush in San Mauro Mare, frazione of San Mauro Pascoli, while a third one, Madiaw Diaw, was wounded. The attack is not for the purpose of robbery, or due to the desire to eliminate witnesses of a crime, but is motivated by racist convictions of the gang members. Shortly after the double murder, the gang's car cuts off a Fiat Ritmo with a few young men on board, who shouted at the Uno driver for the risky maneuver. Shots are fired at the people in the Ritmo, but they are unharmed.

1992

In 1992 no homicides are recorded, but the gang commits four bank robberies and one in a supermarket.

1993

On 24 February the gang is responsible for the murder of Massimiliano Valenti, a 21-year-old boy who had watched a car change after a bank robbery. The gang kidnapped the young man and then transported him to an isolated area where he was executed. The body of Valenti was found in a ditch in the municipality of Zola Predosa. From the autopsy examination, it emerged holes of bullets on his face fired from top to bottom.

On 7 October, electrician Carlo Poli was killed in the Riale frazione of Zola Predosa.

1994 

In 1994 the gang intensified its criminal activity towards the banks, robbing a total of 9 during the year.

On 24 May, the director of the Cassa di Risparmio bank of Pesaro Ubaldo Paci was shot dead while he was opening at a quarter past eight in the morning.

The sentences 
The members of the gang have all been arrested. The trials ended on 6 March 1996 with three life sentences for each of the Savi brothers, a life sentence for Marino Occhipinti, 28 years in prison for Pietro Gugliotta which was then commuted into 18.

Luca Vallicelli, a minor member of the gang, was sentenced to 3 years and 8 months.

After 14 years of imprisonment, in August 2008, Pietro Gugliotta was freed thanks to the launch of the indulto or process of pardoning convicts that display willingness to rejoin organized society and show genuine remores while actively maintaining good behavior as per the Gozzini law of emphasizing rehabilitation.

As part of the gang trial, it was also ordered that the state pay the relatives of the 24 victims 19 billion lire.

The Savi brothers' father, Giuliano Savi, committed suicide on 29 March 1998, swallowing seven boxes of Lorazepam inside a white Uno parked at Villa Verucchio, 13 kilometers from Rimini.

References

1987 establishments in Italy
1994 disestablishments in Italy
Organised crime groups in Italy